The 2013 Avon GT4 European Trophy season was the 6th season of the GT4 European Cup. The trophy name was carried out only this season. The season began on 26 May at Silverstone, and finished on 13 October at Zandvoort after five race weekends.

Entry list

Race calendar and results

References

External links

GT4 European Series
GT4 European Trophy
GT4 European Trophy